European Universities Badminton Championships were the first organised in 2004 and have been organised annually since.

The European Universities Badminton Championships are coordinated by the European University Sports Association along with the 18 other sports on the program of the European universities championships.

Summary

Results

External links 
 EUSA official website

European Badminton Championships
badminton